Riley the Cop is a 1928 American comedy film directed by John Ford. It was a silent film with a synchronized music track and sound effects.

Cast
 J. Farrell MacDonald as James "Aloysius" Riley (as Farrell Macdonald)
 Nancy Drexel as Mary Coronelli
 David Rollins as David "Davy" Collins
 Louise Fazenda as Lena Krausmeyer
 Billy Bevan as Paris Cabman (uncredited)
 Mildred Boyd as Caroline (uncredited)
 Mike Donlin as Crook (uncredited)
 Otto Fries as Munich Cabman (uncredited)
 Dell Henderson as Judge Coronelli (uncredited)
 Isabelle Keith as French Woman on Pier (uncredited)
 Robert Parrish as Boy (uncredited)
 Russ Powell as Mr. Kuchendorf (uncredited)
 Harry Schultz as Hans "Eitel" Krausmeyer (uncredited)
 Ferdinand SchumannasHeink as Julius Kuchendorf (uncredited)
 Rolfe Sedan as French Restaurant Patron (uncredited)
 Harry Semels as French Policeman (uncredited)
 Tom Wilson as Sergeant (uncredited)

References

External links

1928 films
1928 comedy films
American silent feature films
American black-and-white films
Films directed by John Ford
Fox Film films
Transitional sound comedy films
Silent American comedy films
Films set in France
Films set in Germany
1920s American films